Arbat Darreh (also Romanized as Arbaţ Darreh; also known as Ārpā Darreh, Arbat, and Ārpdareh) is a village in Dodangeh-ye Olya Rural District, Ziaabad District, Takestan County, Qazvin Province, Iran. At the 2006 census, its population was 12, in 4 families.

References 

Populated places in Takestan County